Intricate Vengeance is a 2016 television drama pilot created by Wilson Cleveland and directed by Mark Gantt for New Form, the digital studio co-founded by Ron Howard, Brian Grazer and Discovery Communications. The project was announced on April 5, 2016 during New Form's presentation at the annual MIPTV Media Market and released on YouTube as part of New Form's Incubator Three Series of scripted pilots.

Plot 
Four survivors of violent crimes form a dark web market dedicated to producing real-life revenge fantasies for justice-starved clients. They follow a strict code of an eye for an eye, ignoring their own compulsions for revenge and revealing themselves to the public.

Cast and characters

Main Cast
 Wilson Cleveland as Dashiell Foley, Oliver's loyal protector, partner and confidant. Dashiell uses his training as a psychologist to craft the punishment Reagan Winter uses against her husband, Derek. 
 Luke Cook as Oliver Sten, founder and financial backer of the organization who is disfigured with burns and consumed with guilt for causing the car accident that killed his wife Jill. Oliver sees a resemblance to Jill in his client Reagan Winter, leading Dashiell to intervene.
 Meghan Tonjes as Willa Finn, the organization's computer specialist and Oliver's hot-tempered, loyal bodyguard.  She plans all of the technical logistics for Derek Winter's punishment and accuses Jared of sabotaging the plan when Derek ends up dead.
 Vincent Cyr as Jared Cross, the youngest member of the organization and responsible for driving blindfolded clients to and from various secret meeting locations.

Recurring

Reception 
Intricate Vengeance received a 2016 Telly Award for Best Drama and generally favorable reviews from critics. In his April 9, 2016 Ain't It Cool News review, Muldoon wrote, "Wilson Cleveland's built an interesting first episode that's got me eager to see what's next for this bizarre group of individuals."

References

External links 

 
 

2016 television films
American television films